See the Light may refer to:

See the Light (The Jeff Healey Band album), released in 1988
See the Light (Bo Bice album), released in 2007
See the Light (The Hours album), released in 2009
See the Light (Less Than Jake album), released in 2013
See the Light (Jessica 6 album)
"See the Light", a song by DJ Kay Slay from More Than Just a DJ, 2010
"See the Light", a song by Ghost from Prequelle, 2018
"See the Light", a song by Green Day from 21st Century Breakdown, 2009
"See the Lights", a song by Simple Minds from Real Life, 1991